The 1976 Railway Cup Hurling Championship was the 50th staging of the Railway Cup since its establishment by the Gaelic Athletic Association in 1927. The cup began on 15 February 1976 and ended on 17 March 1976.

Leinster were the defending champions.

On 17 March 1976, Munster won the cup following a 4-09 to 4–08 defeat of Leinster in the final. This was their 33rd Railway Cup title overall and their first title since 1970.

Results

Semifinals

Final

Scoring statistics

Top scorers overall

Top scorers in a single game

Bibliography

 Donegan, Des, The Complete Handbook of Gaelic Games (DBA Publications Limited, 2005).

References

Railway Cup Hurling Championship
Railway Cup Hurling Championship
Hurling